Ramiriquí is a town and municipality in the Colombian Department of Boyacá, part of the subregion of the Márquez Province. Ramiriquí borders the department capital Tunja in the north, in the south Chinavita and Zetaquirá, in the east Rondón and Ciénaga and in the west Chivatá, Tibaná and Jenesano.

Etymology 
Ramiriquí was named after the last cacique; Ramirique. In the Chibcha language of the Muisca Ramirraquí means "white earth". An alternative etymology is Ca-mi-quiquí which means "our strength over the grasslands".

History 
The area of Ramiriquí was inhabited by the Muisca before the arrival of the Spanish conquistadors on the Altiplano Cundiboyacense in the 1530s. The northern Muisca Confederation was ruled from nearby Hunza, present-day Tunja, after the mythological and brutal cacique Goranchacha moved the capital there from Ramiriquí. The first ruler of Hunza was Hunzahúa after whom the city was named.

Second-last ruler Quemuenchatocha died in Ramiriquí, after he was beaten by Spanish conquistador Gonzalo Jiménez de Quesada.

The modern town was founded on December 21, 1541 by Spanish friar Pedro Durán.

Within the boundaries of Ramiriquí petroglyphs have been found.

Economy 
Main economical activities in Ramiriquí are agriculture (uchuva, tree tomatoes, cucumbers, beans, blackberries and maize), fishing and crafts.

Born in Ramiriqui 
 Jose Ignacio de Marquez, first civil Colombian president
 José Patrocinio Jiménez, former professional cyclist
 Mauricio Soler, former international cyclist

Gallery

References

External links 
 Fly over Ramiriquí location using GoogleMaps'API

Municipalities of Boyacá Department
Populated places established in 1541
1541 establishments in the Spanish Empire
Muisca Confederation
Muysccubun